David Nicholls may refer to:
David Nicholls (cricketer) (1943–2008), Kent cricketer
David G. Nicholls, professor of biology
David Nicholls (footballer, born 1956), English footballer
David Nicholls (footballer, born 1972), Scottish footballer
David Nicholls (racehorse trainer) (1956–2017), English jockey and racehorse trainer
David Nicholls (theologian) (1936–1996), author in the fields of political theology and Caribbean Studies
David Nicholls (musicologist) (born 1955), English academic and composer
David Nicholls (writer) (born 1966), English novelist and screenwriter
David Shaw Nicholls (born 1959), Scottish architect
David J. Nicholls (1950–2008), English actor

See also
David Nicholl (disambiguation)
David Nichols (disambiguation)
Dave Nichol (1940–2013), Canadian product marketing expert
David Nicolle (born 1944), British historian